Homeobox protein MOX-1 is a protein that in humans is encoded by the MEOX1 gene.

Function 

This gene encodes a member of a subfamily of non-clustered, diverged, antennapedia-like homeobox-containing genes. The encoded protein may play a role in the molecular signaling network regulating somite development. Alternatively spliced transcript variants encoding different isoforms have been described.

Interactions 

MEOX1 has been shown to interact with PAX1 and PAX3.

References

Further reading